LaPoynor Independent School District is a public school district situated between the communities of Poynor and Larue, an unincorporated community; both are located in Henderson County, Texas (USA).  The district is located in southeastern Henderson County and extends into northern Anderson County. Since it serves families in Larue and the city of Poynor (the district's name is a portmanteau of LaRue and Poynor) and a small portion of Coffee City.  In 2009, the school district was rated "recognized" by the Texas Education Agency.

Schools
LaPoynor ISD has three schools located on one campus at 13155 Hwy 175 E, LaRue, TX 75770 - 
LaPoynor High School (Grades 9-12) 
LaPoynor Junior High School (Grades 6-8)
LaPoynor Elementary School (Grades PK-5)

References

External links
LaPoynor ISD

School districts in Henderson County, Texas
School districts in Anderson County, Texas